Iriwang  (Nepali:) -- also transliterated to Eriwāng—is a village development committee in Rolpa District in Rapti Zone of north-eastern Nepal. At the time of the 1991 Nepal census, 4217 people were living within 743 individual households.

References

Populated places in Rolpa District